Iliya Dzhamov (born 11 June 1998) is a Bulgarian footballer who plays as a midfielder for Bulgarian Third League club Chernomorets Burgas.

Career
On 12 February 2019, Dzhamov signed a contract with Etar Veliko Tarnovo after a successful trial period with the club. He made his debut in a 3–0 home win over Vereya on 29 March 2019, playing full 90 minutes.

References

External links
 

1998 births
Living people
Bulgarian footballers
Bulgaria youth international footballers
First Professional Football League (Bulgaria) players
FC CSKA 1948 Sofia players
FC Oborishte players
PFC Lokomotiv Plovdiv players
PFC Dobrudzha Dobrich players
SFC Etar Veliko Tarnovo players
FC Tsarsko Selo Sofia players
Association football midfielders